Luis Ernesto Pérez Gómez (born 12 January 1981) is a Mexican former professional footballer and current manager.

Club career
Pérez debuted in the Primera División with Necaxa in the 1999 Invierno season, playing his first game 21 September in a 3–1 victory against Santos Laguna. Pérez finished the season having played in 11 games, and by the beginning of the next year had a firm grip of the starting position. Pérez was named rookie of the tournament at the end of the season. Pérez played the next four years with Necaxa, until, to the surprise of many, was sold to Monterrey for the Clausura 2003, where he led Monterrey to win the championship by defeating Morelia at Estadio Morelos in Morelia. In the championship season, Pérez appeared in 23 matches, scored two goals and registered an assist. As with Necaxa, Pérez has been in the Monterrey lineup since his arrival.

In 2009, he wore the captain armband as he and his team won the Apertura 2009 tournament by beating Cruz Azul at Estadio Azul in Mexico City. In the championship season, Pérez appeared in 18 matches, scored three goals and registered two assists. He also won the 2010 InterLiga  with Monterrey, beating América in penalty kicks, that qualified Monterrey into the 2010 Copa Libertadores. On June he became property of Guadalajara, by an agreement between the manager of Monterrey and the sporting director of Chivas, Michel Leaño. On 7 July he scored his first goal with Guadalajara.

On 13 December 2016, Pérez announced his retirement from professional soccer.

International career
Perez made his debut with the senior national team on 17 November 1998 in a friendly against El Salvador in Los Angeles. Uncapped through the next two years, he reemerged in 2000. His first official tournament was the 2001 FIFA Confederations Cup, where Mexico did not win any matches. Pérez made appearances for the team in the Gold Cup in 2003, and playing for the U-23 team in the 2004 Summer Olympics. Pérez appeared in the 2005 FIFA Confederations Cup where he played in all five matches, including assisting Jared Borgetti in a losing effort against Germany in the third place match. Pérez was included by then coach Ricardo Lavolpe in the 2006 FIFA World Cup squad. He came on in the 45th minute for Gerardo Torrado in the first match against Iran. Pérez did not appear in the second match against Angola, which Mexico and Angola drew 0–0, however he started the third match against Portugal, but he was sent-off in the 61st minute. Mexico lost the match 2–1. He was banned for the round of 16 match against Argentina because of his red card against Portugal.
He was called up for the friendly against Bosnia and Herzegovina on 9 February 2011, and was subbed on for Javier "Chicharito" Hernández in the 80th minute. He played the rest of the match which Mexico won 2–0. He was called up for the 2011 CONCACAF Gold Cup but had to withdraw due to an injury.

Managerial career
After retiring from playing, Pérez became assistant coach of CD Toledo in Spain's Tercera División.

In August 2020, Pérez became head coach of the under-17 national team, following the departure of Marco Antonio Ruiz.

Career statistics

International

International goals
Scores and results list Mexico's goal tally first.

Honours

Player
Monterrey
Mexican Primera División: Clausura 2003, Apertura 2009, Apertura 2010
CONCACAF Champions League: 2010–11, 2011–12

Mexico U23
CONCACAF Olympic Qualifying Championship: 2004

Mexico
CONCACAF Gold Cup: 2003

Individual
Mexican Primera División Rookie of the Tournament: Invierno 1999
Mexican Primera División Attacking Midfieleder of the Tournament: Clausura 2003, Apertura 2005
Mexican Primera División Defensive Midfieleder of the Tournament: Apertura 2010
CONCACAF Gold Cup Best XI: 2005

Manager
Mexico U20
Revelations Cup: 2021

References

External links
 Luis Pérez's career timeline and detailed statistics
 Luis Ernesto Pérez Article (In Spanish)
 
 

1981 births
Living people
Footballers from Mexico City
Footballers at the 2004 Summer Olympics
Olympic footballers of Mexico
CONCACAF Gold Cup-winning players
2001 FIFA Confederations Cup players
2003 CONCACAF Gold Cup players
2005 FIFA Confederations Cup players
2005 CONCACAF Gold Cup players
2006 FIFA World Cup players
Club Necaxa footballers
C.F. Monterrey players
C.D. Guadalajara footballers
Querétaro F.C. footballers
Chiapas F.C. footballers
Liga MX players
Mexico international footballers
Pan American Games bronze medalists for Mexico
Association football midfielders
Pan American Games medalists in football
Mexican footballers
Footballers at the 2003 Pan American Games
Central American and Caribbean Games silver medalists for Mexico
Competitors at the 2002 Central American and Caribbean Games
Central American and Caribbean Games medalists in football
Medalists at the 2003 Pan American Games